The North American Pollinator Protection Campaign (NAPPC) is an organization of academics, government officials, policy makers, and industry stakeholders working towards pollinator conservation in North America.

NAPPC works in coordination with local, national, and international pollinator protection plans that focus on species, genera, families, or classes of animals. The campaign coordinates with existing projects that address pollinator habitats or migratory corridors. Such plans include Bat Conservation International’s Management Plan, the Plant Conservation Alliance’s Plan, and the São Paulo Declaration on Pollinators .

NAPPC complements these and other pollinator conservation efforts in that it focuses on pollinator protection in the United States, Canada, and Mexico, and addresses species including invertebrates, birds, and mammals. NAPPC coordinates with existing pollinator protection plans to avoid duplication, use resources effectively and replicate proposals in new venues. The NAPPC Action Plan builds on scientific research concerning pollinators and pollinator habitats and promotes and supports pollinator research.

Pollinators in peril
Possible declines in the health and population of pollinators pose a threat to the integrity of biodiversity, to global food webs, and to human health. Factors which could contribute to declines include: 
 improper use of pesticides and herbicides, 
 habitat fragmentation, 
 loss and degradation causing a reduction of food sources and sites for mating, nesting, roosting, and migration, 
 aggressive competition from non-native species, 
 disease, predators, and parasites, 
 climate change, 
 lack of floral diversity.

The importance of pollinator services to ecosystem and economic health is well documented. Animal pollinators are needed for the reproduction of 90% of flowering plants and one third of human food crops Domestic honeybees pollinate approximately $10 billion worth of crops in the U.S. each year. Bee poisonings from pesticides result in annual losses of $14.3 million. Pollinators support biodiversity, as there is a positive correlation between plant diversity and pollinator diversity.

The elimination, replacement or reduction of a pollinator may result in the decline of a plant species, which in turn may affect plant abundance, and hence community dynamics and impact wild animals and humans that depend on those plants.

Goal
The major goal of the alliance of pollinator researchers, conservation and environmental groups, private industry, and state and federal agencies, is to implement an action plan to: 
 coordinate local, national, and international projects in the areas of pollinator research, education and awareness, conservation and restoration, policies and practices, and partnership initiatives,
 aid communication among stakeholders, build coalitions, and leverage existing resources,
 demonstrate a positive measurable impact on the populations and health of pollinating animals within five years.

History
In recognition of the significance of a stable pollinator population, the Pollinator Partnership (formerly the Coevolution Institute) collaborating with the National Fish & Wildlife Foundation established the North American Pollinator Protection Campaign (NAPPC) in 1999.

Since its founding, the NAPPC has focused attention on the plight of pollinators and the need to protect them throughout the U.S., Canada, and Mexico. Two such efforts were the NAPPC Strategic Planning Conferences at the National Academy of Sciences in Washington, DC. These two conferences resulted in a blueprint for pollinator protection.

Accomplishments
 The U.S. Postal Service introduces a "Pollination" stamp series released in June 2007.
 The U.S. Senate passed a Resolution to protect pollinators and designates June 24–30, 2007 National Pollinator Week.
 "Nature's Partners", a pollinator curriculum for Grades 3-6 introduced 
 First-ever pollinator provision written into the 2008 Farm Bill.

Pollinator awards
Each year, NAPPC and the Pollinator Partnership present awards to individuals whose actions have made them notable as pollinators in Canada, the United States, and Mexico. Past awardees include:

2011 
 Dra. M. Isabel Ramirez, Mexico
 Clement Kent, Ph.D., Canada
 Pete and Laura Berthelsen, Farmer-Rancher Award
 Jimmy Brown, USA

2010 
 Tammy Horn, Ph.D., USA
 Musée de l’abeille, Canada
 Sabrina Malach, Canada
 Humberto Berlanga, Mexico 
 Alcee L. Hasting, U.S. House of Representatives, USA

2009 
 Juan Francisco Ornelas, Ph.D, Instituto de Ecología A.C., Mexico
 Homer Woodward 
 Jasper Wyman and Son, Canada
 Sam Earnshaw, Community Alliance with Family Farmers
 Honorable Earl Blumenauer, U.S. House of Representatives

2008
 José Sarakhan, Ph. D. UNAM, Mexico
 Kevin Carver, Prince Edward Island, Canada
 Dave White, NRCS – Montana State Conservationist

2007
 José Ignacio Cuadriello Aguilar, Universidad de Guadalajara, Mexico
 Vicki Beard, City of Guelph, Ontario, Canada
 Jim Wiker, Illinois Natural History Survey

2006
 Jim Dyer, Environment Canada
 Francisco Molina, Ph.D., National University of Mexico
 Betsy Croker, Ph.D., Senate Committee on Agriculture
 Vincent J. Tepedino, Ph.D., USDA

2005
 Dale Bosworth, U.S. Forest Service
 Bruce Knight, USDA NRCS
 Ron Krystynak, Canadian Embassy
 Don Pedro Cahun Uh, Tihosuco, Mexico

References

Pollination management